Pristiorhynchus is a genus of tapeworm, currently containing a single species, Pristiorhynchus palmi.

References

External links
 

Cestoda genera
Monotypic protostome genera